You Can't Beat Love is a 1937 American comedy film directed by Christy Cabanne and written by Maxwell Shane and David Silverstein. The film stars Preston Foster, Joan Fontaine, Herbert Mundin, William Brisbane and Alan Bruce. The film was released on June 25, 1937.

Plot
Jimmy Hughes (Preston Foster) is a fun-loving carouser who can't resist a dare. He is awakened by his gentleman's gentleman Jasper (Herbert Mundin) after a drunken evening in which he misappropriated a milk truck, and instructs Jasper to see that the damages (thirty dollars' worth of lost milk) are paid and the truck is returned. Accompanied by Jasper, Jimmy then fulfills a bet by putting in a day of hard work digging ditches in formal wear, good-naturedly tangling with other crew members in the process. He donates his winnings to a children's charity.

When a campaign truck stops by the site to dispense free cake and solicit support for Mayor Olson's re-election, Jimmy engages in a heckling match with a campaign worker who proves to be the mayor's daughter, Trudy Olson (Joan Fontaine). Trudy angrily suggests that he throw his hat in the ring, and in a bluff, he declares that he will.

When the newspapers run with the story, Jimmy is caught by surprise and the mayor's campaign is concerned. Trudy visits Jimmy at his home with a cake to patch things up, and as he pledges to clear up the misunderstanding, the two become mutually attracted. Trudy accompanies Jimmy to the newspaper office the next day to help him announce his withdrawal, but she mistakenly dares him to run for real, obliging him to do so.

Jimmy pledges a clean campaign, but still ruffles Trudy at times as he continues to pursue her. Things begin to go well between them again as Jimmy helps Trudy save a child who has stolen ice from an ice truck from punishment, and they steal a fun ride on the back of the truck together.

The corrupt police chief, who works for the mayor, secretly attempts to frame Jimmy by luring him to a phony love nest with a hired woman (Barbara Pepper) and a waiting photographer, but catches Jimmy's friend instead. In retaliation, Jimmy recruits the woman's jealous boyfriend, a gangster, to involve the police chief in a citywide gambling ring.

As the mayor comes under criticism for the resulting scandal, Trudy visits Jimmy's campaign office and overhears him colluding with the gamblers. At a debate on election eve, she accuses him of being behind the ring. Jimmy produces a check designating all gambling proceeds to a children's charity, and plays a recording for the crowd of the police chief agreeing to participate in the criminal profits. He also has a recording of the mayor angrily confronting the police chief, proving the mayor's innocence. Jimmy then endorses the mayor for re-election as the guilty parties are arrested. The press asks for a photo of Jimmy kissing Trudy, and she dares him.

Cast 
 Preston Foster as James Ellsworth 'Jimmy' Hughes
 Joan Fontaine as Trudy Olson
 Herbert Mundin as Jasper 'Meadows' Hives
 William Brisbane as Clem Bruner
 Alan Bruce as Scoop Gallagher
 Paul Hurst as Foreman Butch Mehaffey
 Bradley Page as Dwight Parsons
 Berton Churchill as Police Chief Brennan
 Frank M. Thomas as Mayor Olson
 Harold Huber as Pretty Boy Jones
 Paul Guilfoyle as Louie the Weasel
 Barbara Pepper as May 'Bubbles' Smith

References

External links 
 
 
 
 

1937 films
American black-and-white films
1930s English-language films
RKO Pictures films
Films directed by Christy Cabanne
American comedy films
1937 comedy films
1930s American films